The Sierra Northern Railway  is a common carrier railroad company operating in California. The company owns several right of ways originating from those of the former Sacramento Northern Railroad, Northern Electric Railway, Sierra Railway Company Of California, Western Pacific Railroad, and Yolo Shortline Railroad. It handles all freight operations and track maintenance for its parent company, the Sierra Railroad Company. The tracks that are maintained by Sierra Northern are also used by the Sierra Railroad Company's tourist trains.

History
In August 2003, the Sierra Railroad and the Yolo Shortline Railroad merged to form the Sierra Northern Railway. According to the AAR, the line operates  of track in California. It serves a number of industrial areas in the state and interchanges with the Union Pacific Railroad, the BNSF Railway and the Northwestern Pacific Railroad.

In 2022, the company signed a 30-year lease to operate over the Santa Paula Branch Line, formerly operated by the Fillmore and Western Railway.

Routes
The company operates trains over two primary routes:
 Oakdale, California to Standard, California – 
 Woodland, California to West Sacramento, California –

Junctions with other railroads
The Oakdale and West Sacramento (Lovdale)–Woodland lines have junctions with BNSF Railway and Union Pacific. The Fort Bragg–Willits line, which has been closed since the collapse of a tunnel in 2012, has a junction with the defunct Northwestern Pacific Railroad in Willits.

See also

Sacramento RiverTrain
Sierra Railroad
California Western Railroad

References

External links
Sierra Northern Railway

California railroads
Transportation in Mendocino County, California
Transportation in Sacramento, California
Transportation in Stanislaus County, California
Transportation in Yolo County, California

Oakdale, California
West Sacramento, California

Woodland, California